Zvyozdny (masculine), Zvyozdnaya (feminine), or Zvyozdnoye (neuter) is the name of several inhabited localities in Russia.

Urban localities
Zvyozdny, Irkutsk Oblast, a work settlement in Ust-Kutsky District of Irkutsk Oblast
Zvyozdny, Perm Krai, an urban-type settlement in Perm Krai under the administrative jurisdiction of the closed administrative-territorial formation of the same name

Rural localities
Zvyozdny, Kabardino-Balkar Republic, a settlement in Chegemsky District of the Kabardino-Balkar Republic; 
Zvyozdny, Kemerovo Oblast, a settlement in Zvezdnaya Rural Territory of Kemerovsky District in Kemerovo Oblast; 
Zvyozdny, Republic of Mordovia, a settlement in Bersenevsky Selsoviet of Lyambirsky District in the Republic of Mordovia; 
Zvyozdny, Volgograd Oblast, a settlement in Kuybyshevsky Selsoviet of Sredneakhtubinsky District in Volgograd Oblast
Zvyozdnoye, a selo in Krasnogvardeysky District of the Republic of Crimea

Notes